Reiger Park is a coloured township situated in Boksburg in the Ekurhuleni Metropolitan Municipality, Gauteng, South Africa. It was established as Stirtonville after the Second World War when people influxed from rural areas seeking work on the gold mines. In 1963, due to the apartheid government's policy of separate development, the Black people were moved to Vosloorus, the Indians to Actonville and the coloured people were left to stay in Stirtonville, then renamed to Reiger Park.

The locals have given their own unofficial names to the different areas of Reiger Park, such as Jerusalem (due to the many churches in that area), Excuse Me (due to the houses being close together that neighbors say "bless you" when one sneezes), and Popcorn (a new area developed in the 1990s with homes popping up so fast that they were likened to popcorn). In 1997, the Popcorn area experienced violent rent boycotts. In 2008, it was one of the sites of violence during the anti-immigrant riots, beating and burning émigrés on streets described as "war zones".

References

Former Coloured townships in South Africa
Populated places in Ekurhuleni
Townships in Gauteng